GO-GO Gent Roller Derby is a women's flat track roller derby league based in Ghent, Belgium. Founded in 2008, the league currently consists of an All-star travel team and a B-team which compete against teams from other leagues. GO-GO Gent is a member of the Women's Flat Track Derby Association (WFTDA).

History
GO-GO Gent Roller Girls was the first roller derby league in Belgium, with the Antwerp-based One Love Roller Dolls quickly following their lead. GO-GO Gent was accepted as apprentice members of the Women's Flat Track Derby Association in January 2011, and graduated to full membership in December 2012. In December 2011, GO-GO Gent and One Love were named as the top two Belgian leagues by Het Laatste Nieuws.

Their intraleague home bout in January 2011 was the first ever roller derby event to be organized in Belgium. The Mad Megs beat the Bells of Mayhem and the league instantly gained a fanbase in their hometown.

Bouts
The GO-GO Gent travel team was victorious in their bouts against the Paris Rollergirls and RuhrPott RollerGirls. Other previous opponents include the Stuttgart Valley Rollergirlz, Bear City Roller Derby and Copenhagen Roller Derby. They hosted the Brighton Rockers Roller Derby travel team on their Think Pink! breastcancer awareness themed home bout on 10 March 2012.

WFTDA rankings

References

Sport in Ghent
Roller derby leagues established in 2008
Women's Flat Track Derby Association Division 3
Roller derby leagues in Belgium
2008 establishments in Belgium